German folk group with reggae and electronic music influences Milky Chance have released four studio albums, sixteen singles, and two extended plays.

Sadnecessary, Milky Chance's debut studio album, was released on 1 October 2013 in Germany, with singles such as "Down by the River". The album peaked at number 14 in Germany, and it charted at No. 17 on the Billboard 200 chart. In an interview with Edmonton's Sonic 102.9, the band said that it took them three years to write the song "Stolen Dance", the song was first released on their own label Lichtdicht Records on 5 April 2013 as a single and reached number one in Austria, France, Belgium (Wallonia), Switzerland, Poland, Czech Republic and Hungary. "Down by the River" was re-released as a single on 28 March 2014 in Germany through Lichtdicht Records. The song has charted in France, Germany, Switzerland and United Kingdom, and also appears in FIFA 15.

Albums

Studio albums

Acoustic albums

Compilation albums

Extended plays

Singles

Other charted songs

Notes

References

Discographies of German artists